The 1942 Cal Poly Mustangs football team represented California Polytechnic School—now known as California Polytechnic State University, San Luis Obispo—as an independent during the 1942 college football season. Led by Bob Dakan in his first and only season as head coach, Cal Poly compiled a record of 4–3. The team outscored its opponents 179 to 105 for the season. The Mustangs played home games at Mustang Stadium in San Luis Obispo, California. 

Due to World War II, Cal Poly did not field another team until 1945.

Schedule

Notes

References

Cal Poly
Cal Poly Mustangs football seasons
Cal Poly Mustangs football